Nikita Vasilievich Ivanov (born March 31, 1989) is a Kazakhstani ice hockey forward currently playing for ShKO Oskemen of the Kazakhstan Hockey Championship. He played for Barys Astana in the Kontinental Hockey League during the 2016–17 KHL season.

He was a member of the Kazakhstan national team at the 2016 IIHF World Championship.

External links

1989 births
Barys Nur-Sultan players
Dizel Penza players
Kazakhstani ice hockey forwards
Kazzinc-Torpedo players
Krylya Sovetov Moscow players
HC Kuban players
Living people
People from Temirtau
HC Sarov players
Saryarka Karagandy players
Sokol Krasnoyarsk players
21st-century Kazakhstani people